Bug is the name both of the westernmost tongue of land (Landzunge) on the peninsula of Wittow on the German island of Rügen, as well as the name of the former village there. Bug begins south of the village of Dranske and belongs territorially to that municipality.

Origin of the name 
One theory suggests the name Bug goes back to a landowner, Baronet Antonius de Buge, first mentioned in 1284. Another suggests that the word Bug is derived from the German word Biegung = "bend". It is also possible that it may have come from a Slavic word bug = beech.

Geography 
The peninsula of Bug runs in a southwesterly direction from the village of Dranske for a distance of 8 km and has an area of 500 ha. It is only 55 metres wide at its narrowest point in the northeast; in the southwest its maximum width measures about 1,500 metres. To the west of the Bug is the Baltic Sea with the northern part of the island of Hiddensee. To the southwest is the lagoon of Vitter Bodden. A large inlet separates the peninsula from the main body of Rügen itself, comprising the lagoon of Wieker Bodden in the northeast, and the Buger Bodden and the channel of the Rassower Strom in the southeast.

Its southernmost point is the Buger Haken ("Hook of Bug"). Other spits on the bodden side, from north to south, are the Blevser Haken, Eckort,  Fischer Haken and Neubessin (not to be confused with the nearby Neubessin on the island of Hiddensee).

Geology 
The Bug is the largest spit on the island of Rügen, and is still growing. The windwatts of Altbessin and Neubessin in front of the island of Hiddensee to the west are growing towards Bug. Only a regularly dredged shipping channel separates Bug from the island of Hiddensee.

Flora and fauna 
The southern part of the Bug belongs to the Western Pomerania Lagoon Area National Park. The Bug was a military out-of-bounds zone for many years. That enabled nature to develop relatively undisturbed.

The Bug has woods, dunes and species-rich wet areas. The woods are mostly laid out as a forest. As in the northeast of the neighbouring island of Hiddensee the formation of new land in the south of Bug provides a habitat for numerous invertebrates, like worms and mussels. This rich source of food draws rare native bird species as well as many migrating birds.

History 
 1540 – Christoph von der Lancken establishes large fish traps for catching fish.
 1615 – the Bug is totally flooded by a storm surge.
 1658 – construction of a post station as an intermediate station on the Stralsund to Ystad route
 1683 – the post line from Stralsund via Bug to Ystad is opened. The Swedish postal ship, Hiorten, plied this route from 1692 to 1702.
 1700 – the Bug is now treeless as a result of clearing and mostly consists of sandy steppe and pastureland.
 Between 1806 and 1810 – closure of the post route
 1822 – the Bug–Ystad route is opened again, this time with steamships.
 1835-1930 - the Bug grew annually by six metres a year thanks to sand deposition.
 1865 – construction of a telegraph station at the postal harbour of Bug
 1872 - the Bug is cut off from Wittow by the floods of 12/13 November 1872.
 1887/1888 – reforestation of Bug
 1895 – construction of a forester's lodge, start of pilot operations
 1914-1945 - used as a military air base
 1916 – extension for the seaplane base
 1931–1937 – clearing of the Bug: demolition of the customs station, eviction notices served on the inhabitants, in Dranske almost all buildings were knocked down
 1935–1945 – Bug air base
 1946/1947 – the Red Army blow up and dismantle the installations on the Bug. The asphalt airfield was blown up and planted.
 1947 – the Bug is uninhabited, in the south nature spreads unhindered.
 1954 – a youth hostel is built.
 1965 – the NVA opens Dranske/Bug duty station for the 6th Flotilla of the Volksmarine.
 to 1990 - the Bug is an out-of-bounds area.
 1990/1991 – use of the fast patrol boat base by the Bundesmarine
 1991–1999 – concepts of use put forward 
 since 2001 – renovation of the Bug, demolition of all old buildings and plans for a holiday and leisure centre
 since 2003 – project stalls due to lack of sufficient funding from its private investors
 2019 - Airstrip built for small planes to land

Spits of the Baltic Sea
Peninsulas of Mecklenburg-Western Pomerania
Geography of Rügen
Training establishments of the Luftwaffe
Wittow